St. Michael Island is an island on the southeast side of the Norton Sound in Alaska.

St. Michael Island contains two settlements, St. Michael, on the island's east side, and Stebbins, on the northwest side.

St. Michael Island was named by traders of the Russian-American Company in 1833, when they built a trading post at the site of the current village of St. Michael.  It is named after the archangel Michael.

References

Islands of the Bering Sea
Islands of Alaska
Islands of Nome Census Area, Alaska
Islands of Unorganized Borough, Alaska